Merritt F. White was a member of the Wisconsin State Senate.

Biography
White was born on August 26, 1865 in Winneconne, Wisconsin. He attended the University of Wisconsin-Oshkosh. White died on July 28, 1934.

Career
White represented the 19th district in the Senate. Additionally, he was President of Winneconne and a member of the Winnebago County, Wisconsin Board. He was a Republican.

References

People from Winneconne, Wisconsin
County supervisors in Wisconsin
Republican Party Wisconsin state senators
University of Wisconsin–Oshkosh alumni
1865 births
1934 deaths